Cyndi Lou Williams is an American voice actress and script writer. She has mainly appeared in anime series by ADV Films.  She was nominated for an Independent Spirit Award for Best Lead Actress for her performance in Kyle Henry's film, Room (2005), which was nominated for the Cassavetes Award.

Filmography

Anime roles
 Birth - Mu-nyo, Nam’s Ostrich
 Magical Play - Sister Rose
 Petite Princess Yucie - Ercell
 Rurouni Kenshin: Reminiscence - Women
 Sakura Diaries - Alica, Touma's Mother
 Variable Geo - Miranda Johana
 Wedding Peach - Cloud, Nocturne, Butterfly

Video games
 DC Universe Online - Poison Ivy, Queen Bee, Additional Voices

Script writer
 Maburaho
 Happy Lesson
 Science Ninja Team Gatchaman (2005 ADV Dub)

References

External links
 
 

Year of birth missing (living people)
Living people
American video game actresses
American voice actresses
Place of birth missing (living people)
20th-century American actresses
21st-century American actresses